Nestor may refer to:
 Nestor (mythology), King of Pylos in Greek mythology

Arts and entertainment 
 "Nestor" (Ulysses episode) an episode in James Joyce's novel Ulysses
 Nestor Studios, first-ever motion picture studio in Hollywood, Los Angeles
 Nestor, the Long-Eared Christmas Donkey, a Christmas television program

Geography 
 Nestor, San Diego, a neighborhood of San Diego, California
 Mount Nestor (Antarctica), in the Achaean Range of Antarctica
 Mount Nestor (Alberta), a mountain in Alberta, Canada

People 
 Nestor (surname), anglicised form of Mac an Adhastair, an Irish family
 Nestor (given name), a name of Greek origin, from Greek mythology

Science and technology 
 Nestor (genus), a genus of parrots
 NESTOR Project, an international scientific collaboration for the deployment of a neutrino telescope
 NESTOR (encryption), a family of voice encryption devices used by the United States during the Vietnam War era
 659 Nestor, an asteroid

Ships
 , three ships of the Royal Navy
 , a Second World War Royal Australian Navy destroyer which remained the property of the British Royal Navy
 , a number of ships of this name
 , an LNG carrier
 Nestor (sternwheeler), a steamboat that operated in Oregon and Washington State

Other uses 
 Nestor (solitaire), a card game
 Tropical Storm Nestor
 Typhoon Nestor (1997)
 A West Cornwall Railway steam locomotive

See also 
 Dniester, a river in Eastern Europe
 Nester (disambiguation)
 Nestori, a given name
 Nestorianism, a Christian theological doctrine condemned as heretical at the Council of Ephesus in 431
 Nestorius, Ecumenical Patriarch of Constantinople 428–431